Darker than Black is a 2007 Japanese anime series created by Tensai Okamura. Set in modern Japan, the narrative focuses on how ten years prior to the events of series, a mysterious spatial anomaly known as "Heaven's Gate" appeared in South America, shortly followed by the opening of "Hell's Gate" in Tokyo altering the sky and wreaking havoc on the landscape. During this time, people possessing various special abilities emerged, each capable of different supernatural feats—these are known as contractors. The series follows the exploits of agents Hei and his comrades of the Syndicate organization operating in a post-apocalyptic Tokyo and their mission to uncover the mysteries of the Hell's Gate.

Darker than Black was first announced in December 2006 though the first trailer was revealed in March 2007. The 25-episode anime was produced by Bones. It was directed and written by Tensai Okamura, along with character designs drawn by Takahiro Komori and based on the original designs by Yuji Iwahara, art direction by Takashi Aoi, sound direction by Kazuhiro Wakabayashi and soundtrack music composed by Yoko Kanno. The series was broadcast on MBS between April 6 and September 28, 2007, and aired later on HBC, CBC, TBS and Animax.

Aniplex released the complete series in Japan on nine DVD volumes between July 25, 2007 and March 26, 2008. The ninth DVD volume also included an unaired 26th original video animation episode. Aniplex later compiled the series in a Blu-ray box set released in Japan on September 30, 2009. The series was also licensed by Funimation for an English release in Region 1. Funimation released the series in six DVD volumes between November 25, 2008 and August 11, 2009. Funimation later released the series in a DVD box set on April 19, 2011 in Region 1.

The series uses four pieces of theme music: two opening themes and two ending themes. "Howling" by Abingdon Boys School was used as the opening theme for the first 14 episodes while "Kakusei Heroism (The Hero Without a "Name")" by An Cafe was used as the second opening theme from episodes 15 onwards.  by Rie fu was used as the ending theme for the first 14 episodes while "Dreams" by High and Mighty Color was used as the second ending theme from episodes 15 onwards.


Episode list

Home media release
Aniplex

Funimation Entertainment

References
General

Specific

External links
Official anime website 

Episodes
2007 Japanese television seasons